Kenneth Healey (1899–1985) was the 3rd Bishop of Grimsby.

Educated at Moulton Grammar School, he was ordained in 1932. His first post was as a Curate in Grantham after which  became Rector of Bloxholm. Subsequently Rural Dean of Lafford and then Archdeacon of Lincoln, from 1966 he was one of the diocese's’s two suffragan bishops, the other being the Bishop of Grantham. Until his death he continued to serve as an assistant bishop.

Notes

1899 births
Bishops of Grimsby
Archdeacons of Lincoln
20th-century Church of England bishops
1985 deaths
People educated at Spalding Grammar School